Max Schär (born 12 June 1953) is  a Swiss male handball player. He was a member of the Switzerland men's national handball team. He was part of the  team at the 1980 Summer Olympics and 1984 Summer Olympics. On club level he played for RTV 1879 Basel in Switzerland.

References

Living people
Handball players at the 1980 Summer Olympics
1953 births
Swiss male handball players
Handball players at the 1984 Summer Olympics
Olympic handball players of Switzerland
People from Zofingen
Sportspeople from Aargau